Andrzej Osiecimski-Czapski (8 July 1899 – 14 May 1976) was a Polish rower. He competed at the 1924 Summer Olympics in Paris with the men's single sculls where he was eliminated in heat one.

Osiecimski-Czapski was also an ice hockey player with AZS Warszawa, and competed for the Polish national team at the 1926 European Championships.

References

1899 births
1976 deaths
AZS Warszawa (ice hockey) players
European Rowing Championships medalists
Olympic rowers of Poland
People from Vilensky Uyezd
People from the Russian Empire of Polish descent
Polish ice hockey players
Polish male rowers
Rowers at the 1924 Summer Olympics
Sportspeople from Vilnius